Events from the year 2012 in Syria.

Incumbents
President: Bashar al-Assad
Prime Minister: 
 until 23 June: Adel Safar
 23 June – 6 August: Riyad Farid Hijab
 6 August – 11 August: Omar Ibrahim Ghalawanji 
 starting 11 August: Wael Nader al-Halqi

Events
For events related to the Civil War, see Timeline of the Syrian Civil War (January–April 2012), Timeline of the Syrian Civil War (May–August 2012) and Timeline of the Syrian Civil War (September–December 2012)

The 2012 Syrian protests and demonstrations were protests by university students against the war and Bashar al Assad and his government. It was in response to the raid on Aleppo university in may 2012 and Homs student campus. Hunger demonstrations also erupted sparked by the mounting hunger and increasing poverty. Between May and August, hundreds in western and northern Syria have organised anti-government street protests and hunger strikes and demonstrations against poverty which was met with force like tear gas but university students kept ongoing until fighting became more common so protesters ended their peaceful protest movement.

Births

Deaths
January 11 – Gilles Jacquier, French journalist
February 22 – Rémi Ochlik, French journalist and Marie Colvin, American journalist
May 28 – Bassel Shehadeh
July 18 – Dawoud Rajiha, Assef Shawkat and Hasan Turkmani
July 20 – Hisham Ikhtiyar
August 20 – Mika Yamamoto
September 26 – Maya Nasser

 
2010s in Syria
Syria
Years of the 21st century in Syria
Syria